Lost in the Cedar Wood is the fifth studio album by British singer-songwriter Johnny Flynn, released on 14 May 2021 through Transgressive Records. The album is a collaboration between Flynn and British nature writer Robert Macfarlane.

Background 
Flynn and Macfarlane collaborated to make Lost in the Cedar Wood beginning in the first half of 2020, during the COVID-19 pandemic. In an interview, Flynn noted that much of the writing was done separately, with communication with Macfarlane via WhatsApp, due to COVID lockdown restrictions.

The album is loosely based on the Epic of Gilgamesh, aiming to compare the themes of the ancient work with the modern world in the context of the pandemic. The album was recorded in a solar-powered cottage in Hampshire, England.

The track "Home and Dry" was released as a single, entitled "Home & Dry (For the Fishing Industry Safety Group)" on July 7, 2020.

A music video animated and directed by Lynn Tomlinson was released for the track "Ten Degrees of Strange".

Reception 
The album has a score of 76 on the review aggregator Metacritic, signifying "generally favorable reviews". NME gave Lost in the Cedar Wood four out of five stars, comparing it with the "joyful sound of spotting sunshine in the darkest of times". Clash magazine gave the album a rating of 8/10, calling it a "barnburner". Timothy Monger, writing for AllMusic, rated the album 4/5, praising the collaboration between Flynn and Macfarlane.

Track listing

Personnel
 Charlie Andrew – production, mixing
 Matthew Glasbey – mixing, engineering, additional production
 Guy Davie – mastering
 Cosmo Sheldrake – engineering
 Beatrice Minns – cover art
 Flora Wallace – back cover

Charts

Notes

References 

Johnny Flynn (musician) albums
2021 albums
Transgressive Records albums